The 2020 Thailand Champions Cup was the 4th Thailand Champions Cup, an annual football match contested by the winners of the previous season's Thai League 1 and Thai FA Cup competitions. It was sponsored by Government Savings Bank (Omsin Bank), and known as the Omsin Thailand Champions Cup for sponsorship purposes. The match was played at SCG Stadium, Nonthaburi and contested by 2019 Thai League 1 champions Chiangrai United, and Port as the champions of the 2019 Thai FA Cup.

Qualified teams

Match

Details

Assistant referees:
 Pattarapong Kidsatid
 Thanat Chucheun
Fourth official:
 Wiwat Jampa-on
Assistant VAR:
 Sivakorn Pu-udom
 Rawut Nakrit

Winner

See also
 2020–21 Thai League 1
 2020–21 Thai League 2
 2020–21 Thai League 3
 2020–21 Thai FA Cup
 2020 Thai League Cup

References

 https://www.thaiticketmajor.com/sport/thailand-champions-cup-2020.html

2020 in Thai football cups
Thailand Champions Cup
2020